Oswego County Courthouse is a historic courthouse located at Oswego in Oswego County, New York.  It was built in 1859-1860 and altered in 1891 and again in 1962.  The two story building rises above a cruciform plan and is constructed of load bearing masonry walls faced with smooth ashlar limestone.  It features a portico surmounted by a domed cupola.  It was designed by architect Horatio Nelson White (1814–1892).

It was listed on the National Register of Historic Places in 2000.

References

Courthouses on the National Register of Historic Places in New York (state)
County courthouses in New York (state)
Government buildings completed in 1860
Buildings and structures in Oswego County, New York
Oswego, New York
National Register of Historic Places in Oswego County, New York